Metro Plaza is a two complex of towers in Guangzhou, China. Construction of the complex was completed in 1996.

Gallery

See also
 List of tallest buildings in Guangzhou

References

External links

Skyscraper office buildings in Guangzhou
Buildings and structures completed in 1996
Twin towers
Skyscraper hotels in Guangzhou
Skyscrapers in Guangzhou